Janusz Rokicki (born 16 August 1974 in Wisła) is a paralympic athlete from Poland competing mainly in category F57 shot put and discus events.

Janusz competed in the 2004 Summer Paralympics he competed in the discus and won a silver in the F58 shot put. In 2008 in the shot put but failed to win a second medal.

References

Paralympic athletes of Poland
Athletes (track and field) at the 2004 Summer Paralympics
Athletes (track and field) at the 2008 Summer Paralympics
Athletes (track and field) at the 2012 Summer Paralympics
Athletes (track and field) at the 2016 Summer Paralympics
Paralympic silver medalists for Poland
Living people
People from Wisła
1974 births
Sportspeople from Silesian Voivodeship
Medalists at the 2004 Summer Paralympics
Medalists at the 2012 Summer Paralympics
Polish male discus throwers
Polish male shot putters
Medalists at the 2016 Summer Paralympics
Paralympic medalists in athletics (track and field)
20th-century Polish people
21st-century Polish people
Wheelchair shot putters
Paralympic shot putters